
Year 694 (DCXCIV) was a common year starting on Thursday (link will display the full calendar) of the Julian calendar. The denomination 694 for this year has been used since the early medieval period, when the Anno Domini calendar era became the prevalent method in Europe for naming years.

Events

By place

Byzantine Empire 
 The Mardaites raid Muslim-held territories, from their chief stronghold Hagioupolis, in northern Syria (approximate date).

Europe 
 November 9 – King Ergica of the Visigoths accuses the Jews of aiding the Muslims, and sentences all Jews to slavery.

Britain 
 King Ine of Wessex attacks Kent, and extorts 30,000 pence from its people, in recompense for the murder of King Mul.
 King Sæbbi of Essex abdicates the throne, and is succeeded by his sons Sigeheard and Swæfred (approximate date).

Asia 
 Asuka, imperial capital of Japan, is abandoned by Empress Jitō. She moves her court to Fujiwara-kyō (Nara Prefecture).
 Qapaghan Khan (694–716) succeeds his brother Illterish Khan, as ruler of the Eastern Turkic Khaganate (Central Asia).

Births 
 Fujiwara no Umakai, Japanese statesman (d. 737)
 Hammad Ar-Rawiya, Arab scholar (approximate date)
 Mildthryth, Anglo-Saxon abbess (approximate date)

Deaths 
 Clovis IV, King of the Franks (b. 677)
 Coenred, king of Dorset (approximate date)
 Rodoald, duke of Friuli (Italy)
 Xue Huai-yi, Chinese Buddhist monk

References

Sources